Hammad Niazi is a Pakistani Urdu language poet. He writes ghazals and poems. He won the second position in the gazal competition held at the 2009 Annual Women’s Week at Fatima Jinnah Women University.

Career

Niazi's two poetry collections khirki mein khwab and zara nam ho have published. His poetry work is creative and new imagery. He has been appreciated by writers. H e is the joint secretary of a literary organisation Halqa-e Arbab-e Zauq, Lahore, Pakistan.

See also
 List of Pakistani poets

Bibliography

 khirki mein khwab
 zara nam ho

References

External links
 Ghazals and poems of 15 modern poets published

Living people
Pakistani poets
Poets from Lahore
Year of birth missing (living people)